Fraxinus chiisanensis is a species of flowering plant in the family Oleaceae, native to South Korea. With only about 20,000 mature trees found in nine locations, it is assessed as Endangered due to severe population fragmentation, and some logging pressure. In spite of its Endangered status, it is still dominant in those streamside mountain forests where it does occur.

References

chiisanensis
Endemic flora of South Korea
Plants described in 1929